Nicolas Peschier (born 16 May 1984, in Guilherand-Granges) is a French slalom canoeist who competed at the international level from 1999 to 2016. In the early part of his career he was specializing on the C1 class. He also competed in the C2 class from 2011 to 2015 together with Pierre Labarelle.

He won five medals at the ICF Canoe Slalom World Championships with three golds (C1 team: 2007; C2 team: 2011, 2014), a silver (C1 team: 2009) and a bronze (C1 team: 2013). He also won eight medals at the European Championships (3 golds, 3 silvers and 2 bronzes).

Peschier won the overall World Cup title in the C2 class in 2012.

Peschier competed in the C1 event at the 2004 Summer Olympics in Athens, but was eliminated in the qualifying rounds, finishing in 14th place.

His older brother Benoît is Olympic champion from the K1 event at the 2004 Summer Olympics in Athens. Their father Claude is world champion in the K1 event from 1969.

World Cup individual podiums

References

12 September 2009 final results of the men's C1 team slalom event for the 2009 ICF Canoe Slalom World Championships. – accessed 12 September 2009.

External links

1984 births
Canoeists at the 2004 Summer Olympics
French male canoeists
Living people
Olympic canoeists of France
Medalists at the ICF Canoe Slalom World Championships